Dinner at Eight is an album by American keyboardist and composer Wayne Horvitz recorded in 1985 and released on the German Dossier label and re-released on Abstrakce Records

Reception
The AllMusic review by Brian Olewnick awarded the album 3 stars stating "several of the compositions tend to linger quite pleasantly in one's memory".

Track listing
All compositions by Wayne Horvitz except as indicated
 "Dinner at Eight" - 1:45 
 "This New Generation" - 3:26 
 "3 Questions" - 2:36 
 "Conjunction for C.B." - 2:30 
 "True" - 2:51 
 "Extra Extra" (Horvitz, Doug Wieselman) - 3:31 
 "In Fields They Lay" - 2:40 
 "Second Line" - 4:12 
 "Danced All Night" - 2:32 
 "These Hard Times" - 4:15 
 "Reprise for C.B." - 3:20

Personnel
Wayne Horvitz - Yamaha DX7, drum machine
Elliott Sharp - guitar, bass
Chris Brown - gazamba, wing
Doug Wieselman - clarinet, tenor saxophone
Joey Peters - electronic drums

References

Dossier Records albums
Wayne Horvitz albums
1986 albums